Adams is an unincorporated community in Schleicher County, Texas,. Its elevation is 2,300 ft (701 m). Adams is located northeast of Eldorado, the county seat of Schleicher County.

Climate
The climate in this area is characterized by hot, humid summers and generally mild to cool winters. According to the Köppen climate classification, Adams has a humid subtropical climate, Cfa on climate maps.

References

Unincorporated communities in Schleicher County, Texas
Unincorporated communities in Texas